"Lost Inside Your Love" is a song by the British power pop band Badfinger. Written by bassist Tom Evans, "Lost Inside Your Love" was the third track on the band's 1979 album, Airwaves.

Release
"Lost Inside Your Love" appeared on the album Airwaves, which was Badfinger's first album since Wish You Were Here from 1974. The album flopped, only hitting #125 in America. "Lost Inside You Love", however, was selected to be the album's first single release. Backed with the Joey Molland-written track "Come Down Hard", the song, like the album, was not successful, not charting in America or Britain. Despite the failure, the single was followed up with a more successful single, "Love Is Gonna Come at Last", that same year.

Cash Box described it as a "lilting pop number" with "lush, full vocals and easily building harmonies" and "a catchy guitar phrase."  Record World called it a "mid-tempo ballad that features progressive rock melodies and lovely harmonies."

"Lost Inside Your Love" appeared on the 1989 compilation album, The Best of Badfinger, Vol. 2.

References

Badfinger songs
Songs written by Tom Evans (musician)
Song recordings produced by David Malloy
1979 songs
Elektra Records singles